Kilpisjärvi is a medium-sized lake located at the north-western tip of Finland and northernmost Sweden.

The lake is divided into two parts, Kilpisjärvi and Alajärvi.

Being located on the Scandinavian Mountains, the lake is surrounded by numerous fells, most notably Saana. The northern location and high elevation cause the lake to be frozen most of the year.

References

External links

Torne river basin
Kilpisjärvi
Finland–Sweden border
International lakes of Europe
Landforms of Lapland (Finland)
Kilpisjärvi